Hassop is a civil parish in the Derbyshire Dales district of Derbyshire, England. The parish contains 18 listed buildings that are recorded in the National Heritage List for England. Of these, one is listed at Grade I, the highest of the three grades, one is at Grade II*, the middle grade, and the others are at Grade II, the lowest grade.  The parish contains the village of Hassop and the surrounding area.  The Church of All Saints is listed at Grade I, and the other major building in the parish, Hassop Hall, is listed at Grade II*.  Many of the other listed buildings are associated with the hall, or are in the grounds.  The rest of the listed buildings include a house and a public house, both with associated structures, a farmhouse and outbuildings, and three mileposts.


Key

Buildings

References

Citations

Sources

 

Lists of listed buildings in Derbyshire